The Tsardom of Bulgaria, also referred to as the Third Bulgarian Tsardom, sometimes translated in English as the "Kingdom of Bulgaria", was a constitutional monarchy in Southeastern Europe, which was established on 5 October (O.S. 22 September) 1908, when the Bulgarian state was raised from a principality to a Tsardom.

Ferdinand, founder of the royal family, was crowned a Tsar at the Declaration of Independence, mainly because of his military plans and for seeking options for unification of all lands in the Balkans region with an ethnic Bulgarian majority (lands that had been seized from Bulgaria and given to the Ottoman Empire in the Treaty of Berlin).

The state was almost constantly at war throughout its existence, lending to its nickname as "the Balkan Prussia". For several years Bulgaria mobilized an army of more than 1 million people from its population of about 5 million, and in the 1910s it engaged in three wars – the First and Second Balkan Wars, and the First World War. Following the First World War the Bulgarian army was disbanded and forbidden to exist by the Allied Powers, and all plans for national unification of the Bulgarian lands failed.

Less than two decades later Bulgaria entered the Second World War on the side of the Axis Powers and once again found itself on the losing side, until it switched sides to the Allies in September 1944. In 1946, the monarchy was abolished, its final Tsar was sent into exile, and the Tsardom was replaced by the People's Republic of Bulgaria.

History

Formation

 
Despite the establishment of the Principality of Bulgaria (subject to Ottoman suzerainty) in 1878, and the subsequent Bulgarian control over Eastern Rumelia after 1885, there was still a substantial Bulgarian population in the Balkans living under Ottoman rule, particularly in Macedonia. To complicate matters, Serbia and Greece too made claims over parts of Macedonia, while Serbia, as a Slavic nation, also considered Macedonian Slavs as belonging to the Serbian nation. Thus began a three-sided struggle for control of these areas which lasted until World War I. In 1903 there was a Bulgarian insurrection in Ottoman Macedonia.

In 1908 Ferdinand used the struggles among the Great Powers to declare Bulgaria an independent kingdom with himself as Tsar. He did this on 5 October (though celebrated on 22 September, as Bulgaria remained officially on the Julian Calendar until 1916) in the St Forty Martyrs Church in Veliko Tarnovo. Even before then, however, Bulgaria had only acknowledged the overlordship of the sultan formally. Since 1878, Bulgaria had had its constitution, flag, and anthem, and conducted a separate foreign policy.

Ferdinand took the Bulgarian title "Tsar" in honor of the rulers of the First and Second Bulgarian Empires. However, while previous Bulgarian "tsars" were reckoned as emperors, Ferdinand and his successors were called "kings" outside Bulgaria. The Tarnovo Constitution was retained, with the word "tsar" replacing the word "prince" or ''knyaz''.

The Balkan Wars

First Balkan War 
In 1911 the Nationalist Prime Minister Ivan Geshov set about allying with Greece and Serbia, and the three allies agreed to put aside their rivalries to plan a joint attack on the Ottomans.

 

In February 1912 a secret treaty was signed between Bulgaria and Serbia, which was firstly against Austria-Hungary, but also then redirected by Bulgaria to be against the Ottoman Empire and in May 1912 a similar treaty was signed with Greece. Montenegro was also brought into the pact. The treaties provided for the partition of Macedonia and Thrace between the allies, although the lines of partition were left dangerously vague. After the Ottomans refused to implement reforms in the disputed areas, the First Balkan War broke out in October 1912.

The allies had astonishing success. The Bulgarian army inflicted several crushing defeats on the Ottoman forces and advanced threateningly against Constantinople, while the Serbs and the Greeks took control of Macedonia. The Ottomans sued for peace in December. Negotiations broke down, and fighting resumed in February 1913. The Ottomans lost Adrianople to a Bulgarian task force. A second armistice followed in March, with the Ottomans losing all their European possessions west of the Midia-Enos line, not far from Istanbul. Bulgaria gained possession of most of Thrace, including Adrianople and the Aegean port of Dedeagach (today Alexandroupoli). Bulgaria also gained a slice of Macedonia, north and east of Thessaloniki, but only some small areas along her western borders.

Second Balkan War 
Bulgaria sustained the heaviest casualties of any of the allies, and on this basis felt entitled to the largest share of the spoils. The Serbs, in particular, did not see things this way and refused to vacate any of the territories they had seized in northern Macedonia (that is, the territory roughly corresponding to the modern Republic of North Macedonia), stating that the Bulgarian army had failed to accomplish its pre-war goals at Adrianople (i.e., failing to capture it without Serbian help) and that the pre-war agreements on the division of Macedonia had to be revised. Some circles in Bulgaria inclined toward going to war with Serbia and Greece on this issue. In June 1913 Serbia and Greece formed a new alliance, against Bulgaria. The Serbian Prime Minister, Nikola Pasic, told Greece it could have Thrace if Greece helped Serbia keep Bulgaria out of the Serbian part of Macedonia, and the Greek Prime Minister Eleftherios Venizelos agreed. Seeing this as a violation of the pre-war agreements, and discreetly encouraged by Germany and Austria-Hungary, Tsar Ferdinand declared war on Serbia and Greece and the Bulgarian army attacked on June 29. The Serbian and the Greek forces were initially on the retreat on the western border, but they soon took the upper hand and forced Bulgaria into retreat. The fighting was very harsh, with many casualties, especially during the key Battle of Bregalnica. Soon Romania entered the war and attacked Bulgaria from the north. The Ottoman Empire also attacked from the southeast. The war was now lost for Bulgaria, which had to abandon most of her claims of Macedonia to Serbia and Greece, while the revived Ottomans retook Adrianople. Romania took possession of southern Dobruja.

World War I 

In the aftermath of the Balkan Wars Bulgarian opinion turned against Russia and the western powers, which the Bulgarians felt had done nothing to help them. Bulgaria, Romania, and Greece were content to sit on the fence and observe the fortunes of war before deciding whether to declare their sympathies. 
The government of Vasil Radoslavov aligned Bulgaria with Germany and Austria-Hungary, even though this meant also becoming an ally of the Ottomans, Bulgaria's traditional enemy. But Bulgaria now had no claims against the Ottomans, whereas Serbia, Greece, and Romania (allies of the UK and France) were all in possession of lands perceived in Bulgaria as Bulgarian. Bulgaria, recuperating from the Balkan Wars, sat out the first year of World War I, but when Germany promised to restore the boundaries of the Treaty of San Stefano, Bulgaria, which had the largest army in the Balkans, declared war on Serbia in October 1915. The UK, France, Italy, and Russia then declared war on Bulgaria.

Bulgaria, in alliance with Germany, Austria-Hungary, and the Ottomans, won military victories against Serbia and Romania, taking much of Macedonia (taking Skopje in October), advancing into Greek Macedonia, and taking Dobruja from the Romanians in September 1916. However, the war soon became unpopular with the majority of Bulgarian people, who suffered great economic hardship and also disliked fighting their fellow Orthodox Christians in alliance with the Muslim Ottomans. The Agrarian Party leader, Aleksandar Stamboliyski, was imprisoned for his opposition to the war. The Russian Revolution of February 1917 had a great effect in Bulgaria, spreading antiwar and anti-monarchist sentiment among the troops and in the cities. In June, Radoslavov's government resigned. Mutinies broke out in the army, Stamboliyski was released and a republic was proclaimed.

In September 1918 the French, Serbs, British, Italians, and Greeks broke through on the Macedonian front and Tsar Ferdinand was forced to sue for peace. Stamboliyski favored democratic reforms, not a revolution. To head off the revolutionaries, he persuaded Ferdinand to abdicate in favor of his son Boris III. The revolutionaries were suppressed and the army disbanded. Under the Treaty of Neuilly (November 1919), Bulgaria lost its Aegean coastline (Western Thrace) to Greece and part of its Macedonian territory and the Western Outlands to the new state of the Kingdom of Yugoslavia, and had to give Southern Dobruja back to the Kingdom of Romania. The country had to reduce its army to no more than 20,000 men and pay reparations exceeding $100 million. Bulgarians generally refer to the results of the treaty as the "Second National Catastrophe." Elections in March 1920 gave the Agrarians a large majority, and Stamboliyski formed Bulgaria's first genuinely democratic government.

The Interwar Period

After World War I, Bulgaria had already lost a lot of territory, which included a coast to the Aegean Sea with Dede Agach (Alexandroupoli), an important part for the Bulgarian economy and the Western Outlands. The 1879 constitution did not draw a clear line between the powers of the king and the powers of Parliament. This was a problem common with most constitutional monarchies. While the framers of the 1879 constitution intended to put most of the power in the hands of Parliament, it was possible for a clever enough monarch to gain control of the machinery of government. Such was the case with Tsar Ferdinand, who however had been forced to abdicate after the back-to-back losses of the Balkan Wars and World War I. His son Boris then succeeded him on the throne, but the young king could not replace the power his father had built through three decades of intrigue. Boris also did not command the great moral authority that his father had built.

Stamboliyski's cabinet 
Parliament came to dominate after Boris appointed Aleksandar Stamboliyski as prime minister. Stamboliyski's Agrarian Party soon dominated Parliament with over half the seats. The rest of the seats were taken by the Bulgarian Communist Party, which was the country's second-largest political party and the only other one of any significance (there were a dozen or so minor parties, but they had no representation in Parliament or any real significance). The Agrarian Party chiefly represented peasants, especially those who were disgruntled with the government in Sofia since Ferdinand's reign saw extensive corruption and theft of money from the peasantry. Also while most of the lower classes in Bulgaria supported the annexation of Macedonia, they were disgruntled about the heavy bloodshed incurred in two unsuccessful wars to retake it. Indeed, Stamboliyski spent the war years in jail due to his vociferous criticism of it. As for the BCP, it was mainly staffed by the intelligentsia and urban professionals, but its chief constituents were the poorest peasants and other minorities. The AP by comparison represented better-off peasants. Under this climate, Stamboliyski hastily enacted a land reform in 1920, which was designed to break up some state properties, church lands, and the holdings of wealthier peasants. Predictably, it gave him widespread support and forced the BCP into an alliance with the AP mainly to gain a voice in Parliament.

Stamboliyski faced huge social problems in what was still a poor country, inhabited mostly by peasant smallholders. Bulgaria was saddled with huge war reparations to Yugoslavia and Romania and had to deal with the problem of refugees as pro-Bulgarian Macedonians had to leave Yugoslav Macedonia. Nevertheless, Stamboliyski was able to carry through many social reforms, although opposition from the Tsar, the landlords, and the officers of the much-reduced but still influential army was powerful. Another bitter enemy was the Internal Macedonian Revolutionary Organization (VMRO), which favored war to regain independence for Macedonia. Faced with this array of enemies, Stamboliyski allied himself with the Bulgarian Communist Party and opened relations with the Soviet Union.

Stamboliyski immediately embarked on drastic economic reforms. He abolished the mercantile monopoly on grain and replaced it with a state syndicate, dismantled large urban and rural estates and sold the surplus to the poor, introduced a compulsory labour law to alleviate the post-war unemployment problem, introduced a progressive income tax and made secondary education obligatory. All aspects of the radical reform policy were designed to rid society of 'noxious' classes such as lawyers, usurers and merchants, to distribute capital and obligations more evenly throughout society, and to raise the standard of living of the landless and poor peasants. In foreign policy, Stamboliyski officially renounced Bulgaria's territorial claims, which he associated with a standing army, monarchy, large government spending and other pre-war phenomena that the peasants considered anachronistic. In the aftermath of the war, no great power was available for the protection of Bulgarian interests in the Balkans. The traditional approach to foreign policy was therefore abandoned in favour of rapprochement with all European Powers and the new government of Kemal Ataturk in Turkey, membership of the League of Nations and friendship with the new Kingdom of Serbs, Croats and Slovenes (later the Kingdom of Yugoslavia). Bulgarian support for Atatürk's revolutionary Turkish Republic in 1920 greatly improved relations with Turkey. Reconciling with Yugoslavia was a necessary step towards Stamboliyski's ultimate goal of establishing a multiethnic Balkan Peasants' Federation. An improvement in relations with Yugoslavia was contingent on a crackdown on the powerful Macedonian extremist movement. Thus, in 1921, Stamboliyski began a two-year program of severe repression of the IMRO; in 1923, Yugoslavia and Bulgaria agreed at the Nis Convention to cooperate in controlling extremism.
Stamboliyski was a convinced anti-communist and sought to create an international movement to combat Marxism. This was his so-called "Green International", a counter to the communist "Red International". He travelled to Eastern European capitals promoting his view of a peasant alliance. But trouble began when he tried to spread it in Yugoslavia, a country that had very similar conditions to Bulgaria (i.e. very little industry and a large communist presence). Stamboliyski was well-liked in Belgrade because of supporting a peaceful solution to the Macedonia problem. He also advocated uniting all the Slavic-speaking nations in Eastern Europe into one large Yugoslav confederation. But he got into trouble because of the militant IMRO faction at home. Many Macedonian leaders had lived in Sofia since the failed 1903 revolt against the Ottoman Empire, and now they were joined by others who fled the Yugoslavian government (which maintained as its official position that Macedonians were ethnic Serbs). Since Bulgaria had been forced to limit the size of its armed forces after World War I, IMRO chieftains gained control of much of the border area with Yugoslavia.

Under the leadership of a large Macedonian group in Sofia, the strong nationalist elements remaining in Bulgaria found the new pacifist policy alarming. The urban working class, which was not helped by the agrarian reforms, moved towards the Communists or the Socialist Workers. There was continued inflation and industrial exploitation. Many of Stamboliyski's subordinates stirred up social tensions by adopting highly dogmatic positions in favour of the rights of the peasants. A confederation called the National Alliance reorganised the Bulgarian right, which had been silent since the war. In 1922 the leaders of this group were imprisoned by Stamboliyski's Orange Guard, which temporarily stopped it from getting going. Meanwhile, in late 1922 and early 1923, Macedonian nationalists occupied Kyustendil on the Yugoslav border. They attacked government officials to protest against the rapprochement with Yugoslavia and Kingdom of Greece. Stamboliyski's response was mass arrests, an accelerated campaign against IMRO terrorism, a purge of his own fragmented and notoriously corrupt party, and called a new parliamentary election. These measures united the diverse opponents of the Agrarians (IMRO, the National Alliance, army factions and the social democrats) into a coalition led by Aleksandar Tsankov. The Communists remained outside the group. Bulgaria's western creditors did not want to protect a government that had rejected their policy of reparations. IMRO agents brutally assassinated Stamboliyski in June 1923 and the conspirators soon took control of the whole country with only a scattered and ineffective peasant resistance.

The 1923 Bulgarian coup d'etat, Tsankov and Lyapchev's cabinets 

In March 1923 Stamboliyski signed an agreement with Yugoslavia recognizing the new border and agreeing to suppress IMRO. This triggered a nationalist reaction, and on 9 June there was a coup organized by the armed forces under General Ivan Valkov's Military Union with support from the Tsar and other right-wing elements of the Tsardom after the AP controlled 87% of Parliament in the elections that year. The Bulgarian government could only muster a handful of troops to resist and even worse was a peasant mob with no guns rallied by Stamboliyski. Despite this, the streets of Sofia erupted in chaos and the hapless prime minister was lynched in addition to attacks on unarmed peasants.

The whole affair seriously tar brushed Bulgaria's international image. A right-wing government under Aleksandar Tsankov took power, backed by the Tsar, the army, and the VMRO.

The September Uprising began in 1923, after the 9 June coup d'état, when Alexander Stamboliyski was planning to capture Pazardzhik with his sympathizers to restore his power, which was quickly disrupted by the Bulgarian Army. He was then captured and relocated to Slavovitsa, his birthplace, where he was tortured and killed by IMRO agents. Tsankov's government arrested over 2000 alleged communists in which uprisings began. Vasil Kolarov and Georgi Dimitrov, who were the main leaders of the uprisings, chose Montana as the centre. Many uprisings began in the Northwestern parts of Bulgaria, which were quickly overpowered by the army.

The Communist leader Georgi Dimitrov fled to the Soviet Union. There was savage repression in 1925 following the second of two failed attempts on the Tsar's life in the bomb attack on Sofia Cathedral (the first attempt took place in the mountain pass of Arabakonak). But in 1926, Boris persuaded Tsankov to resign in favour of a more moderate government under Andrey Lyapchev. An amnesty was proclaimed, although the Communists remained banned.

Lyapchev was considered to be more lenient towards the political opposition than Tsankov. The Communists re-emerged in 1927 under the guide of the political party Bulgarian Workers' Party. An independent workers' trade union became the centre of workers' political activity. Under the Macedonian prime minister, the IMRO also had much more freedom. This meant that political assassinations and acts of terrorism could continue unabated. IMRO raids into Yugoslavia ended Bulgaria's rapprochement with that country. The Macedonians demanded preferential economic treatment under Liapchev. the late 1920s brought relative political stability to Bulgaria compared with the previous years. Lyapchev was the leader of a conservative majority in the Sabranie. The press was relatively free, and the institutions of education and the judiciary were functioning independently. Output in industry and agriculture was finally above pre-war levels, and foreign investment was on the rise. But even after being substantially reduced, Bulgaria's reparations payments in 1928 amounted to 20 per cent of its budget, and the return to the Gold standard in that year weakened the economy a year before the Great Depression began. In foreign policy, Lyapchev tried unsuccessfully to improve the terms of British and French reparations from the First World war and to bring Bulgaria out of its post-war diplomatic isolation. The country had already improved its international image through its enthusiastic participation in the League of Nations. In 1926, Bulgaria returned the favour by forcing Greek invading troops to leave southern Bulgaria during the Incident at Petrich. The Macedonian independence movement split over the ultimate goal of its activities in the late 1920s. The supremacist faction sought the incorporation of all Macedonian territory into Bulgaria. The federalist faction (including the IMRO) sought an autonomous Macedonia that could join Bulgaria or Yugoslavia in a protective alliance in the event of a war.

1934 Bulgarian coup d'etat and the beginning of authoritarian rule 

The first daily radio broadcasts appeared in 1930. There were many radio broadcasters such as Radio Sofia (now Radio Bulgaria).

The Agrarians reorganized and won elections in 1931 under the leadership of Nikola Mushanov.

Just when political stability had been restored, the full effects of the Great Depression hit Bulgaria, and social tensions rose again. In May 1934 there was another coup by the military organization Zveno, an authoritarian regime headed by Colonel Kimon Georgiev was established. They dissolved all parties and trade unions and suppressed the IMRO. Their government introduced a corporatist economy, similar to that of Benito Mussolini's Italy. After participating in the Bulgarian coup d'état of 1934, Zveno supporters declared their intention to immediately form an alliance with France and to seek the unification of Bulgaria into an Integral Yugoslavia.

In April 1935 Boris III staged a counter-coup with the help of monarchist Zveno member General Pencho Zlatev and took power himself. The political process was controlled by the Tsar, but a form of parliamentary rule was re-introduced. However, political parties remained banned, and uncharismatic prime ministers were appointed by the monarch. He didn't restore the traditional political supremacy of the Sabranie and write a new constitution. In 1936 a broad coalition, the People's Constitutional Bloc, brought together nearly all leftist and centrist factions in a nominal opposition that had the blessing of the tsar. Boris delayed holding a national election until 1938. At that time, only individual candidates were allowed in a carefully controlled election procedure that excluded party candidate lists. Boris claimed that domination of the new subranie by pro-government representatives justified his non-party system, although the People's Constitutional Bloc seated over sixty delegates. Elections in the next two years were strictly limited in order to maintain Boris's control over his parliament.

With the rise of the "King's government" in 1935, Bulgaria entered an era of prosperity and astounding growth, which deservedly qualifies it as the Golden Age of the Third Bulgarian Kingdom. It lasted nearly five years, governed by prime minister Georgi Kyoseivanov. Kyoseivanov's Premiership oversaw the trials of the instigators of the 1934 military coup and also concluded pacts with Yugoslavia and Greece as Nazi Germany undertook a policy of economic isolation of the Balkans. His government also oversaw a policy of rearmament after a treaty concluded with Ioannis Metaxas overturned the military clauses of the Treaty of Neuilly-sur-Seine and the Treaty of Lausanne. Although the signing of the Salonika Agreement of 1938 restored good relations with Yugoslavia and Greece, the territorial issue continued to simmer.

World War II

The government of the Kingdom of Bulgaria under Prime Minister Georgi Kyoseivanov declared a position of neutrality upon the outbreak of World War II. Bulgaria was determined to observe it until the end of the war, but it hoped for bloodless territorial gains to recover the territories lost in the Second Balkan War and World War I, as well as gain other lands with a significant Bulgarian population occupied by neighboring countries. However, it was clear that the central geopolitical position of Bulgaria in the Balkans would inevitably lead to strong external pressure from both World War II factions. On 15 February 1940, following the resignation of Georgi Kyoseivanov, a pro-German Bogdan Filov was appointed Prime Minister of the Kingdom of Bulgaria. On 7 September 1940 Bulgaria succeeded in negotiating the recovery of Southern Dobruja in the Axis-sponsored Treaty of Craiova. Bulgaria also had a non-aggression pact with Turkey.

On 1 March 1941 Bulgaria formally signed the Tripartite Pact, becoming an ally of Nazi Germany, the Empire of Japan, and the Kingdom of Italy. German troops entered the country in preparation for the German invasions of the Kingdom of Greece and the Kingdom of Yugoslavia. When Yugoslavia and Greece were defeated, Bulgaria was allowed to occupy all of Greek Thrace and most of Macedonia. Bulgaria declared war on Britain and the United States but resisted German pressure to declare war on the Soviet Union, fearful of pro-Russian sentiment in the country.

In August 1943 Tsar Boris died suddenly after returning from Germany from heart failure, but also rumoured to be poisoned. He was later succeeded by his six-year-old son Simeon II. Power was held by a council of regents headed by the young Tsar's uncle, Prince Kiril, Bogdan Filov and Nikola Mihov. The new prime minister, Dobri Bozhilov, was in most respects a German puppet. Resistance to the Germans and the Bulgarian regime was widespread by 1943, coordinated mainly by the communists. Together with the Agrarians, now led by Nikola Petkov, the Social Democrats, and even many army officers they founded the Fatherland Front. Partisans operated in the mountainous west and south. By 1944 it was obvious that Germany was losing the war and the regime began to look for a way out. On 1 June 1944 Filov sacked Bozhilov, in the hope of placating internal opposition and the Allies. Filov had reluctantly decided the alliance with Germany should end. His successor Ivan Bagryanov tried to arrange negotiations with the western Allies.

Meanwhile, the capital Sofia was bombed by Allied aircraft in 1941 until 1944. But it was the Red Army which was rapidly advancing towards Bulgaria. In August 1944 Bulgaria unilaterally announced its withdrawal from the war and asked the German troops to leave: Bulgarian troops were hastily withdrawn from Greece and Yugoslavia. In September, the Soviets crossed the northern border. The government, desperate to avoid a Soviet occupation, declared war on Germany, but the Soviets could not be put off, and on September 8, they declared war on Bulgaria – which thus found itself for a few days at war with both Germany and the Soviet Union. The Soviet Union occupied the north-eastern part of Bulgaria along with the key port cities of Varna and Burgas by the next day. By order of the government, the Bulgarian Army offered no resistance. On September 16, the Red Army entered Sofia. During the same day, a pro-Axis government-in-exile was established in Vienna under Aleksandar Tsankov and while it was able to muster a 600-strong Bulgarian SS regiment of Bulgarian anti-communist volunteers already in Germany under a German commander, they had little success.

Holocaust 
The Holocaust in Bulgaria was the persecution of Jews between 1941 and 1944 in the Kingdom of Bulgaria and their deportation and annihilation in the Bulgarian-occupied regions of Yugoslavia and Greece during World War II, arranged by the Nazi Germany-allied government of Tsar Boris III and prime minister Bogdan Filov. The persecution began in 1941 with the passing of anti-Jewish legislation and culminated in March 1943 with the arrest and deportation of almost all11,343of the Jews living in Bulgarian-occupied regions of Northern Greece, Yugoslav Macedonia and Pirot. These were deported by the Bulgarian authorities and sent to extermination camps in German-occupied Poland.

The deportation of the 48,000 Jews from Bulgaria proper was subsequently initiated but halted following widespread protests. Upon becoming aware of the impending plans members of parliament led by Dimitar Peshev pressured the interior minister to revoke the initial deportation order, while public protests and interventions by prominent figures, notably Bulgarian Orthodox Church bishops Stefan of Sofia and Kiril of Plovdiv, persuaded the Tsar first to stop the deportation temporarily in March 1943, and two months later to postpone it indefinitely. The Jews whose deportation from Bulgaria was halted, including all Sofia's 25,743 Jews, were instead internally deported to the countryside and had their property confiscated, and Jewish males between the ages of 20 and 46 were conscripted into the Labour Corps until September 1944. The events that prevented the deportation to extermination camps of about 48,000 Jews in spring 1943 are termed the "Rescue of the Bulgarian Jews". The survival rate of the Jewish population in Bulgaria as a result was one of the highest in Axis Europe.

Communist coup

The Fatherland Front took office in Sofia following a coup d'état, setting up a broad coalition under the former ruler Kimon Georgiev. Under the terms of the peace settlement Bulgaria was allowed to keep Southern Dobruja, but formally renounced all claims to Greek and Yugoslav territory. 150,000 Bulgarians were expelled from Greek Thrace. The Communists deliberately took a minor role in the new government at first, but the Soviet representatives were the real power in the country. A Communist-controlled People's Militia was set up, which harassed and intimidated non-Communist parties.

The new realities of power in Bulgaria were shown when the former regents and hundreds of other officials of the old regime who were arrested on charges of war crimes were executed on 1 February 1945. In September 1946, the monarchy was abolished by plebiscite. This referendum violated the Tarnovo Constitution, which stated that any change in the form of the state could only take place if a Grand National Assembly was convened by the Tsar (in practice, the Tsar acting on the advice of the government). The republic was formally proclaimed a week later, and the young Tsar Simeon was forced into exile. The Communists now openly took power, with Vasil Kolarov becoming president and Dimitrov becoming Prime Minister. Free elections promised for 1946 were blatantly rigged and were boycotted by the opposition. The Agrarians refused to co-operate with the new regime, and in June 1947 their leader Nikola Petkov was arrested. Despite strong international protests, he was executed in September. This marked the Dimitrov Constitution to be introduced and also an establishment of a Communist regime in Bulgaria.

Boundaries 

Bulgaria had its fair share of significant changes to its boundaries throughout independence to communism. Before the First Balkan War, Bulgaria didn't have control over the main parts of the Rhodope Mountains, which included settlements such as Smolyan, Kardzhali and etc. After the war, Bulgaria gained the most territory in total area, as it included the eastern parts of Macedonia, Greek Thrace and Adrianople. Due to its eagerness in Macedonia, in where they didn't obtain the rest of it, began the Second Balkan War which resulted in a harsh Bulgarian defeat. It had lost all its previous gains from the previous war, and had lost its Southern Dobruja to the Kingdom of Romania. It still kept Western Thrace and the Western Outlands. During World War I, Bulgaria joined in 1915 on the side of the Central Powers and gained a large amount of land from the Kingdom of Serbia, which included Macedonia and the sheer extensiveness around Niš. After losing, Bulgaria lost its Aegean coast, and its earned land in Serbia. During the Interwar period, no change in boundaries happened, but there was an incident at Petrich, which was the only conflict it fought internationally during this period. After pro-German prime ministers elected into office, Bulgaria entered World War II on the side of the Axis powers. After the Invasion of Yugoslavia and also of Greece, Bulgaria once again obtained a coastline to the Aegean and Macedonia with Pirot. After the Soviet invasion of Bulgaria in 1944, the Bulgarians obtained Southern Dobruja.

Demographics

Ethnic, lingustic and religious composition 
Since the population was 85% ethnic Bulgarian, there was relatively little social strife aside from the conflict between the haves and have-nots. Most inhabitants of Sofia maintained close ties to the countryside, but this did not prevent a rift between the peasants and urban class (i.e. Sofia versus everyone else), although some were the result of deliberate manipulation by politicians seeking to take advantage of traditional peasant distrust of the "effeminate city slicker". Mostly, however, it was due to a quarrel between the rulers and the ruled. Around 14% of the population were Muslims, mostly Turks (i.e. the remnant of the landowning class), but also a handful of so-called "Pomaks" (ethnic Bulgarians who practiced Islam). The Muslim population was alienated from the dominant Orthodox Christians both due to religious and historical reasons.

Education 
In 1909, a year after Bulgarian independence, a law was adopted to change the structure of the education system, maintainted with different minor changes past several decades. In the post-war years, 1919–1923, there was stagnation in comparative education activities. All conditions of education functioning were extremely worsened. The postwar governments brought about an unstable political and social situation. Third, the main task of the Ministry of Education was restoring the normal functions of schools in this country, laying aside all other activities. The lower secondary school was converted into a junior one by the law, with a three-year course of study and was served to be succeeded by primary schools and basis of secondary schools. Compulsory education became mandatory for children aged 7–14, but only applied to primary school students. High schools were established. Significant changes were made in the education with the law by Stoyan Omarchevski. Basic education institutes were established, courses in high-school were divided into lower and upper courses. After the 1923 coup d'état, education was largely changed, including that the transition from primary to secondary was to be decided by entrance examinations, which was also introduced for graduates of incomplete secondary education. Religion also became a mandatory subject in high school.

In comparison to economics, Bulgaria's educational system was more successful, and less than half the population was illiterate. Eight years of schooling were required and over 80% of children attended. For the few special students who went past elementary school, the high schools were based on the German gymnasium. Competitive examinations were used to judge college applicants, and Bulgaria had several technical and specialized schools in addition to the University of Sofia. Many Bulgarian students also went abroad, primarily to Germany and Austria after educational ties with Russia ended in 1917. Overall, education reached more of the lower classes than anywhere else in Eastern Europe, but on the downside all too many students obtained degrees in the liberal arts and other abstract subjects and could not find work anywhere except in the government bureaucracy. Many of them gravitated towards the Bulgarian Communist Party.

Economy

Overview 
The Bulgarian state at the turn of the 20th century was rural, agrarian, relatively unindustrialised and economically backward nation, in which the economical development hampered by wars and territorial loses. Around 37.80% of the population of about 4.3 million were rural peasants; in 1910, urban dwellers accounted for 19.1% of the total population, a figure that had remained relatively unchanged since Bulgaria had gained independence from Ottoman rule almost 30 years earlier. The literacy rate was low: in 1900 it was 58% in the capital Sofia, 40% in all other cities and 15% in rural areas. The agrarian character of Bulgarian society was reflected in Bulgarian industry, which was completely dominated by textile, food and beverage production: in 1911 these sectors accounted for almost 90% of total Bulgarian factory production. Moreover, Bulgarian industry was extremely inefficient: per capita production was only 28.3 leva (the Bulgarian currency unit) compared to 1,128 per capita in the US; even Russian industry proved more efficient at about 150 leva per capita. Two years after independence, in 1910, the gross national product (GNP-PPP) per capita was $270, last in Europe and the Balkans. Due to the Balkan Wars, the financial cost against the Ottoman Empire alone was 1.3 billion francs. External trade fell drastically in 1913, with exports reduced by 40% and imports by 11%. This led to a soaring trade deficit of over 87 million levs by 1914. Before the war, grain had been a leading Bulgarian export commodity with the most productive area being Dobruja. The state took special care for the development of the region; it built railways to carry grain and other exports to the port of Varna, whose facilities had been developed at great cost. In 1912, it handled more goods than Salonika. By 1938, it had risen to $420, putting Bulgaria ahead of Yugoslavia, Romania, Poland, Portugal, and civil war Spain on this measure. Real GDP per capita in 1939, equated to a 2011 dollar value, was $2,649, the third lowest in Europe after Yugoslavia and Romania. By 1939, 73.5% of manufacturing revenue came from agriculture, and 26.5% from industry and construction. Over 82% of the workforce in 1924 was in agriculture, and this percentage remained almost unchanged until 1945. The unstable political situation and internal conflicts caused the Kingdom of Bulgaria to be the poorest, or among the poorest countries in Europe.

Sectors 
While more successful than the rest of Eastern Europe, Bulgarian agriculture still suffered from the handicaps of backward technology and especially rural  overpopulation and scattered plots (due to the traditional practice of a peasant dividing his land equally among all surviving sons). And all agricultural exports were harmed by the onset of the Great Depression. Still, the country avoided a large food crisis. Thousands of peasant workers engaged in agricultural activities became casualties during the wars. The number of available horses, sheep, cattle and livestock was between 20% and 40% lower. The single most damaging event was the loss of Southern Dobruja: it had accounted for 20% of Bulgarian grain production before the wars and contained the largest and most developed Bulgarian farming communities. This, combined with bad weather, held the harvest of all crops to 79% of the pre-war level in 1914. On the other hand, an underdeveloped economy meant that Bulgaria had little trouble with debt and inflation. Just under half of the industry was owned by foreign companies in contrast to the nearly 80% of Romanian industry. Agricultural productivity was very low. Plots were small and almost exclusively under , but they were worked intensively and even the tiniest  farms often produced crops for market sale. As elsewhere in Eastern Europe, Bulgarian peasants traditionally grew grains for their landowners. After the war, they could not be effectively marketed due to competition from the United States and Western Europe. However, they were able to switch with little difficulty to garden crops and tobacco in contrast to other countries where the peasantry suffered harder due to continued reliance on maize and wheat. By the end of the 1930s, Bulgaria was producing on average twice as much per hectare as developed European countries, including those with worse climatic or soil conditions than Bulgaria. Between 1934 and 1945, the average area of arable land fell from 0.5 to 0.4 hectares per farm. By 1945 there were 1.2 million farms in the country, almost all of them small and unable to support themselves. Only large farms increased in area over the same period, but they held only 2% of the arable land. The fragmentation of land was due to family inheritance patterns and the need to provide land for the growing rural population. In 1930, nearly 50% of the agricultural labor force was unemployed, and winter employment dropped to 30%. Deflation and increased taxes to stop foreign debt caused the total income of the rural population to drop down half of it between 1929 and 1933.

The industrial sector is weak and does not play a significant role in the economy. Between 1895 and 1928 a number of measures were taken to stimulate industry, such as duty-free imports of machinery, tax exemptions and low freight rates. In the period between World War I and the Great Depression, especially between 1926 and 1929, industrial output doubled. The increase was mainly in textiles, pottery, and electricity; almost all other industries, including milling and food processing, leather, woodworking and metalworking were weakened. In the 1930s many of the incentive measures were withdrawn, and the establishment of new enterprises was virtually prohibited. Existing ones continued to be uncompetitive. By 1941, there were 3,467 private, 130 state-owned, and 275 cooperative enterprises in the kingdom, with an average of 26 workers. In that year, 41.3% of industry consisted of small-scale manufacturing and handicrafts, 54.6% of larger-scale manufacturing, and 4.1% represented construction activities. Internationally, Bulgaria lagged behind the leading European industrial countries.

See also
History of Bulgaria
History of Bulgaria (1878–1946)

References

Bibliography 
Khristo Angelov Khristov. Bulgaria, 1300 years. Sofia, Bulgaria: Sofia Press, 1980. Pp. 192.
 

 
States and territories disestablished in 1946
Bulgaria
Bulgaria
1908 in Bulgaria
States and territories established in 1908
Bulgaria
1946 disestablishments in Europe
1908 establishments in Europe
Bulgaria
Axis powers
History of Bulgaria